A Special Election to the United States Senate was held in Maryland on November 4, 1913, to fill the vacancy caused by the death of Sen. Isidor Rayner (a Democrat). The election was the second Senate election (after a June 1913 late election in Georgia) held under the Seventeenth Amendment to the United States Constitution, which required direct popular election of senators, but was the first contested by multiple parties.

Blair Lee I, a Democrat and former state senator, became the second U.S. Senator directly elected by the people of a state under the Constitution's provisions (although other states had previously elected senators indirectly through party primaries and popular elections, which were then ratified by the state legislature). The election led to a controversy when the incumbent who had been appointed to fill Rayner's seat, Republican William P. Jackson, refused to give up his seat to Lee. Jackson claimed that "since he had been appointed under the original constitutional provision, he was entitled to hold his seat until the regularly scheduled adjournment date of the Maryland state assembly."
The Senate considered Jackson's challenge but eventually rejected it and seated Lee.

Results

Results by county

References

1913
Maryland 1913
United States Senate
Maryland
Maryland 1913
United States Senate 1913